Claude Minière (born October 25, 1938) is an essayist and poet.  Initially, he took part in various avant-garde activities before turning towards a more solitary, more classical approach to writing, never forgetting, however, the conquests of Rimbaud, Ezra Pound and free-verse.

Minière was born in Paris. For fifteen years he taught at l’Ecole des Beaux-Arts and is the author of a “panorama” of artistic creativity in France between 1965 and 1996: L’art en France 1965-1995 (Nouvelles editions françaises, Paris, 1995). Together with Margaret Tunstill, he translated two works by Ezra Pound: Henri Gaudier-Brzeska, A Memoir (Henri Gaudier-Brzeska, ed. Tristram, 1992) and Treatise on Harmony (Traité d’Harmonie, ed. Julien Salvy, 1980).  In addition to the many collections of his poetry he has produced three remarkable essays : Pound caractère chinois (ed. Gallimard); Barnett Newman (ed. Tarabuste); and Descartes (ed. Tituli).

Bibliography 

 L’Application des lectrices aux champs, Éditions du Seuil, 1968; poetry
 Glamour, Christian Bourgois Éditeur, 1979; novel
 Lucrèce, Flammarion, 1997; poetry
 La trame d'or, Éditions Aleph, 1999; poetry
 Balthus, Georges Fall éd., 2000; essay
 Le Temps est un dieu dissipé, Tarabuste, 2000; poetry
 Hymne, Tarabuste, 2002; poetry
 Traité du scandale, Rouge Profond, coll. "Stanze", 2005; essay
 Perfection, Rouge Profond, coll. "Stanze", 2005; poetry
 Pound caractère chinois, Gallimard, coll. "L'Infini", 2006; essay 
 Notes sur le départ, Tarabuste, 2008; novel
 Je/hiéroglyphe, Tarabuste, 2011; poetry
 Barnett Newman, Retour vers l'Eden, Tarabuste, 2012; essay
 La trame d'or, collection PaRDèS, Marie Delarbre Éditions, 2013; poetry;  (republication of the 1999 edition, by Aleph).
 "Le théâtre de verdure", collection Les carnets noctambules,  Marie Delarbre Éditions, 2013; poetic essay; .
 gueule noire, limited edition, with two engravings by M. Pérez, Carte Blanche, 2015.
  " Encore cent ans pour Melville", Gallimard, 2018.
  "Courbet, marée montante", invenit ed., 2019; 
  "Un coup de dés", editions Tinbad, 2019.
 "itus et reditus", Le corridor bleu, 2020.
  "Refaire le monde", Gallimard, coll. Blanche, .
  "Comment peut-on être cartésien?", tituli, Paris, ISBN 978-2-37365-147-8.

References

1938 births
Living people
French male poets
20th-century French poets
21st-century French poets
21st-century French male writers
French male essayists
20th-century French essayists
21st-century French essayists
20th-century French male writers